Cebu Ferries was a shipping company based in Batangas City and Cebu City, Philippines.  Its hubs were Batangas Port in Batangas and Pier 4 in Cebu City. It is now part of 2GO Travel.

Formerly the shipping company was a subsidiary of William Gothong & Aboitiz, better knowns as WG&A. When WG&A split up, Jon Ramon Aboitiz retained Cebu Ferries and the shipping company’s sisters SuperCat Fast Ferry Corporation and SuperFerry. Carlos A. Gothong Lines went back to shipping. Cebu Ferries eventually became part of the Aboitiz Transport System which was purchased by Negros Navigation, which in turn was purchased by the Chinese government through its wholly owned private equity firm the China-Asean Investment Cooperation Fund and renamed 2GO Travel.

Destinations
Cebu Ferries served the following destinations:

Luzon
Batangas City
Visayas
Cebu City
Dumaguete
Caticlan, Malay, Aklan (Gateway to Boracay)
Ormoc City, Leyte
Mindanao
Butuan (via Nasipit)
Cagayan de Oro
Iligan City, Lanao del Norte
Ozamis City, Misamis Occidental

Vessels
Cebu Ferries operated the following vessels (as of January 2011):

Ferries:
 St. Augustine of Hippo (formerly Cebu Ferry 1)
 St. Anthony de Padua (formerly Cebu Ferry 2)
 St. Ignatius of Loyola (formerly Cebu Ferry 3)
 Our Lady of Mount Carmel (sold to George and Peter Lines & renamed as M/V GP Ferry 2)
 Our Lady of Lourdes
 Our Lady of Montserrat
 Our Lady of Good Voyage (sold to Gothong Southern and renamed as M/V Doña Conchita Sr., but was later sold by the company to Trans-Asia Shipping Lines and was renamed as M/V Trans-Asia 9)
 Our Lady of Manaoag
 Our Lady of Banneux
 Our Lady of Fatima
 Our Lady of Guadalupe
 Our Lady of the Rule (broken-up by ship breakers in Alang, India)

See also
List of shipping companies in the Philippines

References

External links

Ferries of the Philippines
Ferry companies of the Philippines
Passenger ships of the Philippines
Shipping companies of the Philippines
Transportation in Cebu
Companies based in Cebu City
Companies based in Batangas City
Defunct transportation companies of the Philippines